Mikhail Grigoryevich Shats (Russian: Михаил Григорьевич Шац, born 7 June 1965, Leningrad, RSFSR) is a Russian TV host, actor, YouTuber, and opposition activist. He is also known as a former member of the Coordinating Council of the Russian Opposition.

Biography 
Mikhail Shats was born on 7 June 1965 in Leningrad. Upon graduating from School No. 185 in 1982, he entered the medical faculty of the First Leningrad Medical Institute. He graduated with a specialisation in anesthesiology and resuscitology and later completed his residency at the same institute.

From 1987 to 1994, Shats competed on the KVN TV show as a member of the First Medical Institute and UNECON teams. He also played for the Russian team at the CIS KVN competition.

From 1995 to 2001, he worked at the TV-6 Moscow channel. The program was in the air up to 2004.

From 2006 to 2010, he was the host of the humorous improv show  on the same channel (the show was later aired on DTV as well).

Shats left Russia in March 2022 due to the Russian invasion of Ukraine. He resided in Israel as he had previously obtained Israeli citizenship in 2016. On 2 September 2022, the Russian Ministry of Justice included Shats in the list of "foreign agents".

Political activity 
Together with Tatiana Lazareva, Shats supported the Sozidaniye Charitable Foundation, which assisted orphanages, children's homes, boarding schools, hospitals, and children undergoing treatment in clinics. They also supported the Downside Up Charitable Foundation and actively participated in the foundation's events dedicated to changing society's attitude towards children with Down syndrome.

Shats joined the Russian protest movement (also known as the Bolotnaya revolution) in December 2011. Later, he took part in the elections to the Coordinating Council of the Russian Opposition and was ranked eighth on the candidates' list. Due to his participation in the protests, Shats was fired from the STS TV channel in 2012.

In March 2013, Shats recorded a video appeal in support of the LGBT community and spoke out against the law banning the so-called "propaganda of homosexuality". He was also a member of the public council of the Russian Jewish Congress.

In February 2022, Shats signed an anti-war letter condemning the Russian government for waging war against Ukraine.

Awards 

 TEFI "Best Entertainment Program" (2003) 
 TEFI "Best Entertainment Program Host" (2006)

Family 
Shats is of Jewish origin. He is married to Tatiana Lazareva. She is a TV presenter, actress, singer, and opposition activist. The couple has four children.

In 2021, Shats and Lazareva announced that they had separated. However, as of October 2022, they were not officially divorced.

References 

Living people
1965 births
People listed in Russia as media foreign agents
Russian YouTubers
Russian television actors
Russian male actors
Russian television presenters